Effat Marashi is the widow of Iranian politician and former president Akbar Hashemi Rafsanjani.

2009 protests
In 2009, during election protests she was quoted as saying: "If people see that [the government] has cheated, they should protest on the streets".

Personal life
Marashi married Akbar Hashemi Rafsanjani in 1958. The couple had 5 children: Fatemeh, Mohsen, Faezeh, Mehdi, and Yasser.

References

1935 births
Living people
Akbar Hashemi Rafsanjani
People from Kerman
Wives of presidents of Iran